The 1949 Italian Grand Prix was a motor race for Formula One cars held at Monza on 11 September 1949. It was also given the title of European Grand Prix.

The race was won by Alberto Ascari.

Entries

Classification

Qualifying

Race

References

External links
 The Tenth GP d'Europa, Motor Sport, October 1949, page 405, www.motorsportmagazine.com 

Italian Grand Prix
Italian Grand Prix
Grand Prix
Italian Grand Prix
European Grand Prix